Taveh (also Romanized as Ţāveh and Tāweh) is a village in Khorram Dasht Rural District, in the Central District of Famenin County, Hamadan Province, Iran. At the 2006 census, its population was 1,182, in 303 families.

References 

Populated places in Famenin County